Kashvād (Persian: کشواد) is an Iranian mythical hero. He is an emblem of victory, justice and loyalty in a story narrated in the poetic opus of Shahnameh, the national epic of Iran by the 10th-century poet Ferdowsi Tousi.

Family tree

References

Persian mythology